Senator Conway may refer to:

James F. Conway (born 1933), Missouri State Senate
Joan Carter Conway (born 1951), Maryland State Senate
John Edwards Conway (1934–2014), New Mexico State Senate
Steve Conway (politician) (born 1944), Washington State Senate